Adérónkẹ́ is a feminine Yoruba name and surname meaning "the crown or royalty has found something to cherish". Notable people with that name include:

 Aderonke Adeola, Nigerian film director
 Aderonke Apata (born 1967), Nigerian LGBT activist and former asylum seeker
 Aderonke Kale, Nigerian army psychiatrist

African feminine given names
Nigerian feminine given names